Shannon Dudley is an American historian, focusing in ethnomusicology, Caribbean music, popular music, and national identity, currently the Adelaide D. Currie Cole Endowed Professor at the University of Washington.

Published works
 Carnival Music in Trinidad: Experiencing Music, Expressing Culture (2003), Oxford University Press.

References

Year of birth missing (living people)
Living people
University of Washington faculty
21st-century American historians
American male non-fiction writers
University of California, Berkeley alumni
21st-century American male writers